David Mckee Barnes (born June 20, 1978) is an American musician, singer, and songwriter from Nashville, Tennessee. He has released eight studio albums, including two Christmas albums. His most recent full-length album, Dreaming in Electric Blue, was released in 2020.

Early life
The eldest of three children, Barnes was born in South Carolina in 1978, the son of a pastor who relocated his family to Kosciusko, Mississippi when Barnes was six years old. The Barnes family then moved to Knoxville, Tennessee the summer during his junior year of high school, where he graduated from Farragut High School in 1996. Barnes went to college at Middle Tennessee State University and graduated with a degree in Recording Industry Management. While there, he began playing guitar and writing songs for fun. He was initially only interested in writing material for other performers but was later encouraged by his peers to perform his works himself. Barnes took their advice and began performing within the campus, and then performed at various nearby universities in regional centers as well as his own.

Musical career

Barnes released a 10-track demo album, "little fist big hurt," around 2000. After graduating from Middle Tennessee State University, he began touring and in 2002 released his five-song EP Three, Then Four, as purely a guitar-and-vocals release. With this release and the touring performed around it, Barnes' fan following expanded, with the assistance of internet promotion. Barnes toured heavily for over a year after that. During this period, Barnes met Ed Cash, a record producer who had worked with Bebo Norman, who Barnes had previously met in 1998 at Windy Gap, a Young Life camp in North Carolina.

At the suggestion of Cash, Barnes recorded a full-band studio LP. Barnes released Brother, Bring The Sun in September 2004. This album was critically acclaimed for Barnes' songwriting and overall high-quality presentation for an independent release. Also through its release, Barnes gained notability among singers Amy Grant (who later performed on Barnes' wedding song "I Have and I Always Will"), Vince Gill, and John Mayer. In 2005, Barnes co-produced the five-song EP Today & Tomorrow for his friend Matt Wertz. Barnes also contributed his songwriting to one of its songs.

In 2006, Barnes released his second full band studio album Chasing Mississippi. In mid-to-late 2006, Barnes toured with Matt Wertz with songs from both albums and some newly written material as well. In early 2007 Barnes began experimenting with stand-up comedy and, with support from friends, put together a routine which he performed in Nashville, Tennessee.

In June 2007, Barnes re-entered the studio to record his third album. In April 2008, having signed to the record label Razor and Tie, he released his major-label debut, Me and You and the World. In promotion of the album, the song "Until You", which was previously on Brother, Bring the Sun, was re-recorded and released as a single on February 19, 2008.

In late 2008, Barnes was one of the opening acts for the shows from Orlando through Chicago on Hanson's "The Walk Around the World Tour".

Barnes' songs were also featured on the show What I Like About You, including his song "On a Night Like This", which was featured on the "Three Little Words" episode. They were sung by the main character's, Holly's, English boyfriend named Ben, and are usually serenades.

On February 3, 2009, Barnes released a Valentine's Day EP titled You, the Night, and Candlelight.

In April 2010, Barnes released his fourth full band studio album What We Want, What We Get after having released his single "God Gave Me You" from the same album. The single rose into the top-five Contemporary Christian music chart by June. Barnes appeared on the U.S. soap opera All My Children as himself and performed the song on June 10, 2010.

Blake Shelton released Barnes' song "God Gave Me You" as his second single on his album Red River Blue in fall of 2011. It became Blake's fifth number one song on country radio and has sold over one million units. In 2012, Dave Barnes was nominated for a Grammy Award for Best Country Song for writing the song "God Gave Me You". In an interview with American Songwriter, Dave stated that "I honestly didn't know I could write songs that could be that universal. Songs that could be that successful. I think one of the things about that song, as I have looked back on it and sort of examined under the hood, is that the sentiment is pretty universal... The beauty of "God Gave Me You" was that I finally saw what I had done and it opened this really cool door to me being more conscious about writing songs that appeal to more people, and this new record Stories to Tell really showcases that." Stories to Tell, Dave's fifth full studio album, was released on March 13, 2012.

Dave Barnes' second Christmas collection, A December to Remember, was released on October 29, 2013. It is the follow up to his successful 2010 holiday project Very Merry Christmas. Barnes co-produced A December to Remember, which features six originals, four written and two co-written, such as "So, Santa" and "Better Than Christmas Day". The 11-song line-up also includes five Christmas classics, from "White Christmas" to "It's the Most Wonderful Time of the Year".

On January 28, 2014, he released Golden Days with the album's first single, "Good".

Barnes released a second Valentine's Day EP on February 10, 2015, consisting of six acoustic songs and titled Hymns for Her.

He released his seventh full-length album, Carry On, San Vincente, in 2016.

In 2018 he released the album Who Knew It Would Be So Hard To Be Myself.

In 2020 he released his new album Dreaming in Electric Blue.

Songwriting
As a songwriter, Barnes has both written and co-written songs with Joey Humke for Carrie Underwood, Thomas Rhett and Maren Morris, Reba McEntire, Blake Shelton, Hunter Hayes, Marc Broussard, Bebo Norman, Matt Wertz, Andrew Ripp, Billy Currington, Tim McGraw, Danielle Bradbery, Bethany Dillon, and Lady A.

Personal life 
Barnes and his wife, Annie, have three children - Ben, Suzanna, and Sam.

Discography

Studio albums

Christmas albums

Extended plays

Singles

Awards and nominations 
CMA Awards

|-
| 2012
| "God Gave Me You"
| Song of the Year
| 
|}Dove Awards

|-
| 2018
| "Washed By the Water"
| Southern Gospel Recorded Song of the Year
| 
|}Grammy Awards

|-
| 2012
| "God Gave Me You"
| Best Country Song
| 
|}

References

External links

 

1978 births
Living people
American rock guitarists
American rhythm and blues guitarists
American male guitarists
American male singer-songwriters
American rock singers
American rock songwriters
People from Kosciusko, Mississippi
Middle Tennessee State University alumni
American performers of Christian music
Musicians from Knoxville, Tennessee
Singer-songwriters from Tennessee
Singer-songwriters from Mississippi
Guitarists from Mississippi
Guitarists from Tennessee
21st-century American guitarists
21st-century American male singers
21st-century American singers